Martesia is a genus of bivalves belonging to the family Pholadidae.

The genus has cosmopolitan distribution.

Species:

Martesia clausa 
Martesia cuneiformis 
Martesia cylindrica 
Martesia fragilis 
Martesia mcevoyi 
Martesia meganosensis 
Martesia multistriata 
Martesia nairi 
Martesia oligocenica 
Martesia procurva 
Martesia pygmaea 
Martesia sanctidominici 
Martesia sanctipauli 
Martesia striata 
Martesia truncata

References

Pholadidae
Bivalve genera